JuVaughn Harrison, formerly known as JuVaughn Blake (born April 30, 1999) is an American high jumper and long jumper.

Career

Youth
Harrison attended Columbia high school in Huntsville, Alabama. He recorded bests of 7 feet 2 inches in the high jump and 23 feet 0.5 inches in the long jump.
Oh

Collegiate
On March 12, 2021, in Fayetteville, Arkansas on the occasion of the 2021 NCAA Division I Indoor Track and Field Championships, Harrison set personal records in the high jump with 2.30 m and in the long jump with 8.45 m, thus becoming the first man in history capable of jumping at least 8.40 m in the long jump and 2.30 m in the high jump.

On June 27, 2021, Harrison won both the long jump and the high jump at the US National Team Olympic Trials in Eugene, Oregon. At the 2020 Summer Olympics, he  became the first American man since Jim Thorpe in 1912 to compete in both the long jump and high jump at the Olympics.

Professional
After the 2020 Olympic Trials, Harrison signed with Puma to compete professionally. Harrison finished 5th in the long jump and 7th in the high jump at the 2020 Summer Olympics.

Achievements

Circuit wins and titles
  2022 Diamond League: high jump

National titles
Senior level
Harrison won six national championships.
 NCAA Athletics Championships
 High jump: 2019, 2021
 Long jump: 2019, 2021
 NCAA Indoor Athletics Championships
 High jump: 2021
 Long jump: 2021

Personal bests
Outdoor
High jump: 2.36 m ( College Station, May 14, 2021)
Long jump: 8.47 m ( Eugene, June 28, 2021)
Indoor
High jump: 2.30 m ( Fayetteville, March 12, 2021)
Long jump: 8.45 m ( Fayetteville, March 12, 2021)

References

External links
 
 

1999 births
Living people
American male high jumpers
American male long jumpers
Sportspeople from Huntsville, Alabama
LSU Tigers track and field athletes
Track and field athletes from Alabama
USA Outdoor Track and Field Championships winners
African-American track and field athletes
Athletes (track and field) at the 2020 Summer Olympics
Olympic track and field athletes of the United States
21st-century African-American sportspeople